The Argetoaia is a right tributary of the river Jiu in Romania. It discharges into the Jiu in Scăești.

References

Rivers of Romania
Rivers of Dolj County
Rivers of Mehedinți County